James Wayne Causey (born December 26, 1936) is a retired American professional baseball baseball player. An infielder, he appeared in 1,105 games in Major League Baseball as a shortstop, second baseman and third baseman over 11 seasons for the Baltimore Orioles, Kansas City Athletics, Chicago White Sox, California Angels and Atlanta Braves between 1955 and 1968.

Major League Baseball
His inexperience showed: he batted only .187 in 135 games with the Orioles between 1955 and 1957. Then, after almost four full years of minor league seasoning, he was traded to the Athletics prior to the  season. In Kansas City he would have his most sustained success, batting .270 with 640 hits in 689 games played.

Causey finished 21st in voting for the  American League MVP Award. He played in 139 games and had eight home runs, 44 runs batted in, and a .280 batting average. He then finished 25th in voting for  AL MVP, and leading the league in times on base (265). He had eight homers, 49 RBI, and a .281 average that year.

In his 11 MLB seasons and 1,105 games, he had 819 hits, 35 home runs, 285 RBI, 12 stolen bases, and a .252 batting average.

Education
Causey is a 1955 graduate of Neville High School, Monroe, Louisiana. He received a Bachelor of Science degree in accounting from Northeast Louisiana State College in 1965, after taking classes during each off-season from 1956 on. In 1964, he was named to "Who's Who in American Universities and Colleges."

References

External links

1936 births
Living people
American expatriate baseball players in Canada
American expatriate baseball players in Colombia
Atlanta Braves players
Baltimore Orioles players
Baseball players from Louisiana
California Angels players
Chicago White Sox players
Kansas City Athletics players
Kansas City Royals scouts
Louisville Colonels (minor league) players
Major League Baseball second basemen
Major League Baseball shortstops
Major League Baseball third basemen
San Antonio Missions players
Sportspeople from Ruston, Louisiana
University of Louisiana at Monroe alumni
Vancouver Mounties players